The Sirena is a mythological sea creature from Filipino culture. In some regions of the Philippines, particularly Bicol and Visayas, Sirenas are known as Magindara and portrayed as vicious mermaids. Like Sirens of Greek mythology they have alluring and irresistible singing voices; unlike Sirens, which are portrayed as part woman and part bird, Sirenas are often portrayed as mermaid-like creatures that live under the sea. In Philippine mythology, the Sirena is a mythological aquatic creature with the head and torso of a human female and the tail of a fish. The Sirena is an Engkanto –' the Filipino counterpart of English mermaids. Engkantos are classified as one of the Bantay Tubig, a Filipino term for mythical guardians of the water. In addition to the Sirena, other examples of Bantay Tubig are Siyokoy, Kataw and Ugkoy.  The male version of a Sirena is called a Sireno. Sometimes Sirena are paired with Siyokoy. A popular mermaid character in the Philippines is Dyesebel.

Behavior 
The Sirena has a beautiful and enchanting voice that can attract and hypnotize males, especially fishermen. Sirena sing to sailors and enchant them, distracting them from their work and causing them to walk off ship decks or cause shipwrecks. They sing with enchanting voices while hiding among the rocks by the shore. When the men hear these songs they are hypnotized and are abducted by the Sirena. Some folk traditions claim that the Sirena carry their victims under the sea, sacrificing them to the water deities. Other stories claim that the Sirena pretend to need rescuing from drowning, luring men into the sea, but proceed to squeeze the life out of any man who falls prey to their hoax.

A malevolent Sirena may tease and attract human males with its spellbinding songs. Occasional reports had Sirena grabbing seemingly hypnotized humans and drowning them or taking them under water. Another view had the tempted human chasing the Sirena into deep water until he drowned or that he had a heart attack upon seeing such an Engkanto and toppled into the water to his death.

When a mermaid falls in love with a human she or he becomes tame and obedient to the human.

Dugongs, sea turtles, and small cetaceans such as dolphins usually accompany the Sirena.

Appearance 

Sirena are beautiful sea creatures with the upper body of a human with long, flowing hair that is often curly or wavy and the lower body of a fish or has a tail of a fish. In pre-Hispanic Philippines they were believed to be beautiful.

Folklore

Many Pangasinan myths describe Sirena who drown fishermen and warriors who worship Apo laki. In some stories they are guardians of the waters of "asin-palan", shielding it from the tattooed raiders from the Visayas.

In Pre-colonial Philippines, it was believed that in the full moon or in the Dayaw or Kadayawan, one of the embodiments of the moon who is Bulan descended from the heavens to swim with the mermaids and that the mermaids protected the boy moon from sea monsters.

Popular culture

Marina was a fantasy series that features a mermaid. It aired on February 23, 2004 to November 12, 2004, starring Claudine Barretto.

The first TV series adaptation of Dyesebel was broadcast on GMA Network in 2008. It originally aired on April 28, 2008 and ended on October 17, 2008, completing 125 episodes. It starred Marian Rivera and Dingdong Dantes in the lead roles. Cindy Kurlteto was originally cast as Dyesebel.

A second Dyesebel adaptation was broadcast on ABS-CBN played by Anne Curtis.

References

Visayan mythology
Philippine legendary creatures
Female legendary creatures
Mermaids